Stinson Lake is an unincorporated community in the town of Rumney in Grafton County, New Hampshire, United States. It is located at the south end of Stinson Lake, around the lake's outlet.

References

Unincorporated communities in Grafton County, New Hampshire
Unincorporated communities in New Hampshire